Bhairav or Bhairavnath (alternatively Bhairon or Bhaironnath) was a disciple of Gorakhnath, whose guru was the Matsyendranath. He was considered to have control over all tantrik siddhis and had grown arrogant of his power. He went after Vaishno Devi, considering her to be a little girl. It was only when mata Vaishno Devi took the form of Kali and behead Bhairav and in last he realized her true form and asked for forgiveness. In his dying moments, Bhairav pleaded for forgiveness. The Goddess knew that Bhairav's main intention in attacking her was to achieve his salvation. She not only granted Bhairav liberation from the cycle of reincarnation, but also granted him a boon, whereby every devotee, in order to ensure completion of the pilgrimage of Vaishno Devi, shall also have to visit Bhairav Nath's temple near the Holy cave after having the darshan of the Goddess.

There are many temples of Baba Bhairavnath in India especially in Jammu Division of J&K. 

Black Dogs are the symbol of Bhairavnath and people who have bad wrath of Bhairon Baba used to offer food to Black Dogs So that their evil wrath may subside and may Bhairon Baba's blessings be upon them.￼

References

Hindu pilgrimage sites
Characters in Hindu mythology